Clemyjontri Park is a 2-acre park in McLean, Virginia, opened in 2006, which boasts a setting for children of all abilities to congregate. It is located in the McLean area of Fairfax County, Virginia at 6317 Georgetown Pike. It includes a carousel, four different playground areas around the carousel, and walking trails. Additional parking is available at Langley Fork Park across Georgetown Pike.

The land was donated by Adele Lebowitz in 1997, of Morton’s Department Store and namesake of the "Adele Lebowitz Center for Youth and Family" at the Washington School of Psychiatry, to the Fairfax County Park Authority to build the park.

The name Clemyjontri is derived from the donor’s four children: Carolyn (CL), Emily (EMY), John (Jon), and Petrina (Tri).

The park has been written about in the fictional book Murder Has a Sweet Tooth.

References

External links 
 Clemyjontri Park from the Fairfax County Park Authority
 Friends of Clemyjontri Park

McLean, Virginia
Parks in Fairfax County, Virginia